The Good Times and the Bad Ones is the second studio album by American boy band Why Don't We. The album was released on January 15, 2021 by Atlantic Records. The album was supported by three singles: "Fallin' (Adrenaline)", "Lotus Inn" and "Slow Down". The album debuted at number 3 on the Billboard 200, making it the band's most successful album on the chart.

Singles
"Fallin' (Adrenaline)" was released as the lead single from the album on September 29, 2020. The song peaked at number thirty-seven on the US Billboard Hot 100 chart. "Lotus Inn" was released as the second single from the album on December 4, 2020. "Slow Down" was released as the third single from the album on December 18, 2020, it also contains an interpolation from the guitar riff of 1979 By The Smashing Pumpkins.

Critical reception
Sara London of RIFF Magazine gave the album a mixed review, writing that "they've got a long way to go to cultivate a voice of their own" and that "it seems more like they're siphoning the aura of others rather than creating their own" while also adding that "there are five singers and it's difficult to tell one from the other." She ended her review by saying "even though most of the album is hot off the production line at the teenybopper pop factory, there are glints of originality in songs like "For You" and that "for the casual bubblegum pop listener, it'll suffice for a passably amusing album." Writing for Atwood Magazine, Nasya Blackshear felt that the while the album "didn't reinvent the world of pop, it did reinvent Why Don't We" and that "the album is light-hearted and an easy listen making a solid transition from tween to teen/young adult music," although she did feel that "the tracklist order feels a bit up and down."

Matt Collar of AllMusic opined that the album "could use a few more uptempo songs to keep things from sounding samey" but felt that it speaks to the band's "deepening pop maturity."

Commercial performance 
The album debuted at number three on the  Billboard 200 with 46,000 equivalent album units earned. Of that sum, 38,000 comprise album sales (making it the top-selling album of the week), 7,500 comprise SEA units (equating to 11.34 million on-demand streams of the album’s songs) and a little under 500 comprise TEA units.

Track listing

Charts

Release history

References

2021 albums
Atlantic Records albums
Why Don't We albums